= Huawei G6600 Passport =

Mobile phone

- First released: December 2009
- Availability by region: Q1 2010
- Color: Classic Brown
- Battery: Removable Li-Ion 1000 mAh battery
- Data inputs: Keypad: QWERTY

The Huawei G6600 Passport is a mobile phone released in 2010, developed and manufactured by Huawei.
